Md. Shah Chowdhury was a Bangladesh Nationalist Party politician, industrialist, and the former Member of Parliament of Chittagong-11.

Career
Chowdhury was elected to parliament from Chittagong-11(Patiya Upazila) as a Bangladesh Nationalist Party candidate in 1991 with 48,715 votes. His nearest rival was S M Yusuf of the Awami League with 39,215 votes. In 1992, he oversaw the construction of the Patiya-Kharna road. He was re-elected in the February 1996 Bangladeshi general election.

Death 
Chowdhury died on 29 December 1997. Shah Newaz Chowdhury Montu Smriti Sangsad is an organization dedicated to remembering his name and legacy.

References

Bangladesh Nationalist Party politicians
5th Jatiya Sangsad members
Year of birth missing (living people)
6th Jatiya Sangsad members
1997 deaths
People from Chittagong District